Jamnagar was a   coaster which was built in 1924 for Maharaja Jam Sahib of Nawanagar. In 1941 she entered service with the Royal Indian Navy. In 1944, she was sold into merchant service before being requisitioned by the Ministry of War Transport (MoWT) and renamed Empire Bulbul. In 1947, she was sold into merchant service and renamed Hellenic Bulbul. The name Hellenic Bee had been allocated but she ran aground and sank before the proposed name change could be implemented.

Description
Jamnagar was built by J I Thornycroft & Co Ltd, Woolston. She was yard number 1030. Jamnagar was launched on 2 September 1924 and completed in October 1924.

She was propelled by a triple expansion steam engine which had cylinders of 13½ inches (62 cm),  and  bore by  stroke. The engine was built by Thornycroft. She had a GRT of 567 and a NRT of 279.

Career
Jamnagar was operated by the Mercantile Marine Department of the State of Nawanagar. In 1940, she was sold to Hashim Mohomed Ganchi, India. Her port of registry was Karachi. In 1940, Jamnagar was requisitioned by the Royal Indian Navy for use as an auxiliary patrol vessel. She was returned to Ganchi in 1944 and then requisitioned by the MoWT and renamed Empire Bulbul. In 1947, she was sold to Yannoulatos (Far East) Ltd, Hong Kong and renamed Hellenic Bulbul. She was operated under the management of the British Indian Steam Navigation Co Ltd. The name Hellenic Bee had been allocated, but on 29 August 1948 she ran aground on Domanik Island, Bay of Bengal , and then sank.

Official Numbers and Code Letters

Official Numbers were a forerunner to IMO Numbers. Empire Bulbul had the United Kingdom Official Number 147002.

Jamnagar used the Code Letters MNLX. Empire Bulbul used the Code Letters MNLS.

References

1924 ships
Ships built in Southampton
Steamships of India
Merchant ships of India
World War II merchant ships of India
Auxiliary ships of the Royal Indian Navy
Empire ships
Ministry of War Transport ships
Steamships of the United Kingdom
Steamships of Hong Kong
Merchant ships of Hong Kong
Shipwrecks in the Indian Ocean
Maritime incidents in 1948